Sip is an unincorporated community in Johnson County, Kentucky, United States. It is located at an elevation of 837 feet (255 m). Its ZIP code is 41219.

References

 

Unincorporated communities in Johnson County, Kentucky
Unincorporated communities in Kentucky